Abdulkerim Çakar (born 14 April 2001) is a German professional footballer who plays as a forward for Turkish club Gaziantep.

Club career
Born in Germersheim, Çakar played for local side FV Germersheim, before joining professional clubs 1. FC Kaiserslautern and Eintracht Frankfurt.

In August 2021, Çakar moved on loan to Portuguese side Académico Viseu. He made a slow start to his career in Viseu, only playing two of a possible twelve after his arrival.

On 11 August 2022, Çakar signed a three-year contract with Gaziantep in Turkey.

International career
Born in Germany, Çakar is of Turkish descent. He has represented Germany at youth international level.

Career statistics

Club

References

2001 births
Living people
People from Germersheim
German people of Turkish descent
German footballers
Footballers from Rhineland-Palatinate
Association football forwards
Germany youth international footballers
Regionalliga players
Liga Portugal 2 players
1. FC Kaiserslautern players
Eintracht Frankfurt players
TSG 1899 Hoffenheim players
TSG 1899 Hoffenheim II players
Académico de Viseu F.C. players
Gaziantep F.K. footballers
German expatriate footballers
German expatriate sportspeople in Portugal
Expatriate footballers in Portugal